Mykola Temniuk (born March 31, 1992) is a Ukrainian footballer playing with FC Continentals in the Canadian Soccer League.

Playing career

Europe 
Temniuk was a product of BVUFK Brovary, and later in 2012 played in the Ukrainian Amateur Football League with Vodnyk Lviv.  In 2012, he played abroad in the III Liga with Stal Sanok. After a season abroad he returned to the Ukrainian Amateur Football League to play with FC Ahrobiznes Volochysk. During his tenure with Ahrobiznes, he assisted in securing promotion to the Ukrainian Second League in the 2016-17 season by winning the league title. He also finished as the league's top goal scorer with 18 goals in 18 matches.

The following season the team secured promotion to the Ukrainian First League after winning the league. He also scored the club's first goal in the professional realm on July 9, 2017, against Ternopil in the 2017–18 Ukrainian Cup. He played in several matches for Ahrobiznes during the 2018–19 Ukrainian First League season but parted ways with the club on August 27, 2018. After his release, he signed a contract with Nyva Ternopil. After the conclusion of the season, he departed from Nyva as his contract was terminated.

Canada 
In 2019, he played abroad once more in the Canadian Soccer League with FC Vorkuta. In his debut season with Vorkuta, he assisted in securing the First Division title. He also finished as the league's top goalscorer with 18 goals. He played in the opening round of the playoffs against Kingsman SC and recorded a goal but Vorkuta was eliminated from the competition in a penalty shootout. He also featured in the Second Division championship final and contributed a goal against Serbian White Eagles B in a 2-0 victory.

The following season he re-signed with Vorkuta. In his sophomore season with Vorkuta, he featured in the CSL Championship final against Scarborough SC and assisted in securing the championship. Earlier he contributed a goal in the club's victory over the Serbian White Eagles in the first round of the postseason. In 2021, he assisted in securing Vorkuta's third regular-season title and secured the ProSound Cup against Scarborough. He also played in the 2021 playoffs where Vorkuta was defeated by Scarborough in the championship final. 

In 2022, Vorkuta was renamed FC Continentals and he re-signed with the club for the season. Throughout the season, he helped Continentals secure a playoff berth by finishing fourth in the standings. He made his third consecutive championship final appearance against Scarborough once again where he won his second championship title by recording two goals.

Career statistics

Club

Honors 
FC Vorkuta

CSL Championship: 2020, 2022
Canadian Soccer League First Division/Regular Season: 2019, 2021 
 ProSound Cup: 2021 
CSL Golden Boot: 2019

References 

1992 births
Living people
People from Shepetivka
Ukrainian footballers
FC Ahrobiznes Volochysk players
FC Nyva Ternopil players
FC Continentals players
Ukrainian First League players
Canadian Soccer League (1998–present) players
Association football forwards
Ukrainian Second League players
III liga players
Sportspeople from Khmelnytskyi Oblast